Jefferson Moore is an American actor, writer, producer, director and editor based in Louisville, Kentucky.  He is the founder and owner of Kelly's Filmworks.

Background
Jefferson attended The University of Kentucky and Western Kentucky University and began working in sales. He met his wife Kelly while attending WKU. He began his acting career by accident.  He attended an audition at a regional theater with his wife, who was auditioning.  The director asked him to read the lead lines as the person who was supposed to didn't show up, and he wound up with the part. Afterwards, he continued doing stage work and later moved into on-camera roles in music videos, television commercials, and short films; after nine years, he landed his first principal role in a feature film opposite Lou Diamond Phillips and Andre Braugher.

In 2001, he founded Kelly's Filmworks Ltd. (named for his wife and co-founder, Kelly) and proceeded to write, produce, direct and edit his own projects.  The company also handles its own distribution. Incidentally, each movie has a character named Kelly somewhere in the film.

Jefferson has served as editor on several of his films, under the pseudonym Pate Walters.

Filmography
"Feed Jake" - 1992 Music video - actor
Volunteers – 1993 TV pilot – actor
Brotherly Love – 2000 TV movie – actor
A Better Way to Die  – 2000 – actor
Out of the Black – 2001 – actor
Out of the Black – 2001 – stunts
Artworks  – 2003 – actor
Turning the Corner  – 2004 – actor
La Sposa – 2004 – actor, writer, director
Oldham County – 2004 – actor
The Perfect Stranger – 2005 – actor, producer, writer, editor, director
Another Perfect Stranger – 2007 – actor, producer, writer, director
The Stranger (TV series) – 2007 – actor, producer, writer, director
 Clancy – 2009 – actor, producer, writer, director
The Perfect Gift – 2009 – actor, producer, writer, director
1 Message – 2011 – actor, producer, writer, director
Pieces of Easter – 2013 – actor, producer, writer, director
Nikki and the Perfect Stranger – 2013 – actor, producer, writer, director
Reading Kate – 2015 – actor, producer, writer, director
Clancy Once Again – 2017 – actor, producer, writer, director
Smoketown (TV miniseries) – 2018 – actor
National Anthem Girl (documentary) – 2019 – producer, writer, director
Meeting Kate – 2021 – actor, producer, writer, director

External links

References

Living people
American male film actors
American male television actors
American male screenwriters
American editors
American television producers
Male actors from Louisville, Kentucky
Western Kentucky University alumni
Writers from Louisville, Kentucky
Film directors from Kentucky
Screenwriters from Kentucky
Film producers from Kentucky
University of Kentucky alumni
Year of birth missing (living people)